Hammond House may refer to:

in Canada
 Hammond House (Sackville, New Brunswick), one of Canada's National Historic Sites in New Brunswick

in the United States
(by state then city)
Mary Alice Hammond House, Searcy, Arkansas, listed on the National Register of Historic Places (NRHP) in White County, Arkansas
Hammond's Estate Site, Santa Barbara, California, NRHP-listed in Santa Barbara County
Captain Hammond House, White City, Florida, NRHP-listed in St. Lucie County
Fort-Hammond-Willis House, Milledgeville, Georgia, NRHP-listed in Baldwin County
Edward J. Hammond Hall, Winter Harbor, Maine, NRHP-listed in Hancock County
Hammond-Harwood House, Annapolis, Maryland, NRHP-listed
Benson-Hammond House, Linthicum Heights, Maryland, NRHP-listed
Hammond House (Newton, Massachusetts), NRHP-listed
E. C. Hammond House, Newton, Massachusetts, NRHP-listed
Ephraim Hammond House, Waltham, Massachusetts, NRHP-listed
Jonathan Hammond House, Waltham, Massachusetts, NRHP-listed in Massachusetts
Hammond House (Hawthorne, New York), NRHP-listed in Westchester County
John Henry Hammond House, New York, New York, which houses the Consulate-General of Russia in New York City
Moses Hammond House, Archdale, North Carolina, NRHP-listed in Randolph County
Boggan-Hammond House and Alexander Little Wing, Wadesboro, North Carolina, NRHP-listed in Anson County
Charles Hammond House, North Augusta, South Carolina, NRHP-listed in Aiken County
Hammond House (Calvert, Texas), NRHP-listed in Robertson County

See also
Camp Hammond (Yarmouth, Maine), NRHP-listed